The Istvaeones were a Germanic group of tribes living near the banks of the Rhine during the Roman Empire which reportedly shared a common culture and origin. The Istaevones were contrasted to neighbouring groups, the Ingaevones on the North Sea coast, and the Herminones, living inland of these groups.

In linguistics, the term "Istvaeonic languages" is also sometimes used in discussions about the grouping of the northwestern West Germanic languages, consisting of Frankish and its descendants (principally Old Dutch) as well as several closely related historical dialects. Whether or not the Istvaeones spoke a Germanic language according to modern definitions, the theory proposes that their language indirectly influenced later Germanic languages in the area as a substrate.

Nomenclature 
The term Istvaeonic is derived from a culturo-linguistic grouping of Germanic tribes mentioned by Tacitus, who used the spelling "Istæuones" in his Germania, and Pliny the Elder, who used the spelling "Istuaeones". Pliny further specified its meaning by claiming that the Istævones lived near the Rhine. Jacob Grimm in the book Deutsche Mythologie argued that Iscaevones was the correct form, partly because it would connect the name to an ancestor figure in Norse mythology named Ask and partly because in Pseudo-Nennius where the name Mannus is corrupted as Alanus, the ancestor of the Istaevones appears as Escio or Hisicion. Pseudo-Nennius derives his information from the Frankish Table of Nations (c. 520), which names the Franks, Romans, Bretons and Alamanni as descendants of Istio, one of the three sons of Mannus. (Other spellings of this name that appear in the manuscripts include Estio, Escio, Hostius, Ostius, Hisisio, Hissitio, Hisitio, Hessitio and Scius.)

Tacitus (56 CE – ~  120): 
The Germanic tribes themselves I should regard as aboriginal, and not mixed at all with other races through immigration or intercourse. (...) In their ancient songs, their only way of remembering or recording the past, they celebrate an earth-born god, Tuisco, and his son Mannus, as the origin of their race, as their founders. To Mannus they assign three sons, from whose names, they say, the coast tribes are called Ingævones; those of the interior, Herminones; all the rest, Istævones.

Pliny the Elder (23 CE – 79): 
There are five German races; the Vandili, parts of whom are the Burgundiones, the Varini, the Carini, and the Gutones: the Ingævones, forming a second race, a portion of whom are the Cimbri, the Teutoni, and the tribes of the Chauci. The Istævones, who join up to the Rhine [proximi autem rheno istuaeones], and to whom the Cimbri belong [sic.], are the third race; while the Hermiones, forming a fourth, dwell in the interior, and include the Suevi, the Hermunduri, the Chatti, and the Cherusci: the fifth race is that of the Peucini, who are also the Basternæ, adjoining the Dacians previously mentioned.

The Istvaeones (Pliny) or Istaevones (Tacitus) are therefore one of the least clearly defined of these groups, but Pliny and Tacitus and other classical sources clearly associated various tribes with the Rhine frontier region, and the description of Pliny also explains that the Chatti, Cherusci and Chauci are not included in the group. In this period, between them and the Rhine, Tacitus also specifically named various tribes such as the Chamavi, Bructeri, Sugambri, Ubii and others. Also by implication the definitions above include all of the Romanized Germani Cisrhenani on the Roman side of the Rhine, because Tacitus (and before him by Julius Caesar) agreed that these peoples were related to the Germanic tribes on the other side of the Rhine. Tacitus mentions that in his time they called themselves the Tungri. He also mentions that some Rhine tribes by his time, such as the Batavi, and Cananefates, were in fact recent immigrants, and relatives of the Chatti. Throughout the Roman era, starting already in the time of Caesar, more eastern Germanic tribes pressed the Rhine area, most famously the Chauci, Saxons and Suevians, pushing tribes into the area such as the Usipetes, Tencteri and Ampsivarii. Despite the pressures from two directions, the Chamavi and Bructeri survived in the same area until late Roman times, along with various tribes who may have been there in the time of Tacitus, or may have immigrated, such as the Salii and Chattuari (whose name suggests a connection to the Chatti).

The historical sources give no complete account of the Istvaeones. Modern historians attempt to extrapolate their tribal constituents based on later sources, archeological findings and linguistic information.

Istvaeones as possible ancestors to the Franks

There is an overlap between Germanic tribes generally assumed to have been Istvaeonic in terms of dialect and culture, and the tribes who came later to be thought of collectively as the earliest "Franks".  speculated that the Chamavi may have been the first such tribe, around which neighbours came also to be called by this name:

A Roman marching-song joyfully recorded in a fourth-century source, is associated with the 260s; but the Franks' first appearance in a contemporary source was in 289. [...] The Chamavi were mentioned as a Frankish people as early as 289, the Bructeri from 307, the Chattuarri from 306-15, the Salii or Salians from 357, and the Amsivarii and Tubantes from c. 364-75.

The large "Irmionic" nation of the Chatti also seem to have been considered Franks, or allies of the Franks, at least once. In one of the last mentions of them as a separate people, Sulpicius Alexander, cited by Gregory of Tours mentions them as being led along with the Ampsivarii by the Frankish king Marcomer.

Other Franks, sometimes called  Salii, moved into Roman territory from north of the Rhine and were settled at the delta island of Batavia, and then Toxandria. In the 5th century, in the time of Flavius Aëtius they conquered as far as Tournai, despite Roman opposition, and later worked with the Romans against Attila the Hun. Further up the Rhine, the Franks eventually had a kingdom centred upon the Roman city of Cologne, on the left bank of the Rhine. The Chattuari also apparently crossed the Rhine and held lands on both sides. A separate Chamavi population possibly still existed as late as the 8th century, when it has been proposed that a separate legal code was published under Charlemagne, the Lex Chamavorum.

During the late 5th century, the Frankish frontier tribes and the Roman territories of Northern Gaul came to be politically united under a Frankish military leader of northern Roman Gaul, King Clovis I, and his Merovingian dynasty. He published the Lex Salica, a legal code applicable to the Roman region south of the original Frankish territories, from the Loire in modern France to the Silva Carbonaria in modern Belgium. It grew to rule large parts of the former Western Roman Empire and Germania.

At some point in the above sequence, the ethnonyms "Frank" and "Frankish" morphed into a term closer in meaning to a proto-state or political identity, rather than a tribal or ethnic designation and can no longer be considered synonymous with the Istvaeones. However from the Merovingian period it is clear, as for example reported by Gregory of Tours, that there was a "Frankish language" distinct from the Romance languages which continued to be spoken by much of the population in what would become France.

The Istvaeones as a linguistic grouping 

The German linguist Friedrich Maurer (1898–1984), in his book "Nordgermanen und Alemannen", used the term Istvaeones to refer to a unattested proto-language, or dialectal grouping, ancestral to Old Frankish, Old Dutch and, at the very least, influenced several dialects of West Central German.

The Istvaeones as an archeological culture 

Finds assigned to the Istvaeones are characterized by a greater heterogeneity than can be found in the other Germanic archaeological groupings. Their predominant burial type is the pyre grave. There are no richly equipped princely graves or weapons as grave goods to be found as, for example, occur with the neighboring Elbe Germanic groups. Scholars have speculated about whether weapons were used as "immaterial" grave goods  instead. In other words, weapons made of metal were placed on the pyre of a warrior, for example, but only his ashes were buried in the pyre grave. This is, however, a controversial thesis. Weapons as grave goods first appear in northern Gaul, i.e. on the Roman side of the Rhine, in burial graves, and are not found to the east of the Rhine until the Merovingian period.

References

Bibliography 
 Grimm, Jacob (1835). Deutsche Mythologie (German Mythology); From English released version Grimm's Teutonic Mythology (1888); Available online by Northvegr © 2004-2007:Chapter 15, page 2-; 3. File retrieved 11-18-2015.
 Tacitus, Germania (1st Century AD). (in Latin)  
 Friedrich Maurer (1942) Nordgermanen und Alemannen:  Studien zur germanische und frühdeutschen Sprachgeschichte, Stammes- und Volkskunde, Strasbourg:  Hünenburg.

See also
List of Germanic peoples

 
Early Germanic peoples
Pre-Roman Iron Age